Vladimir Alexandrovich Dmitriev (born August 25, 1953, Moscow) is a Russian businessman and former chairman of Vnesheconombank, a job he held from May 27, 2004 to February 26, 2016. He is the president of Tennis Europe from 2017 to 2020.

References

Living people
1953 births
Recipients of the Order of Honour (Russia)
Recipients of the Medal of the Order "For Merit to the Fatherland" II class
Russian bankers
Financial University under the Government of the Russian Federation alumni